Amy Florence Lennox is an Olivier Award nominated actress. She has appeared in shows including Kinky Boots and Cabaret. She was also in the main cast of the television show Holby City for three series playing Chloe Godard.

Career
She played Margot in the original West End cast of Legally Blonde in 2009, for which she also understudied Sheridan Smith in the leading role of Elle Woods. In 2012 she played Doralee in the UK touring production of 9 to 5.

In 2011 she performed in the play DECADE directed by Rupert Goold for Headlong Theatre, the 12 person cast also included Tobias Menzies. Later in 2011 Lennox performed in the world premiere of Soho Cinders, playing the role of Velcro. The performance was for a charity gala held at the Queen's Theatre.  She went on to play the role in the first fully staged production of the show at the Soho Theatre in 2012.

In 2015, she played Cathy in The Last Five Years at Lyric Theatre in Belfast alongside the actor Fra Fee. She then played Lauren in the original West End cast of Kinky Boots. She was nominated for both the Laurence Olivier Award for Best Actress in a Supporting Role in a Musical and the WhatsOnStage  Award for Best Supporting Actress in a Musical for her performance.

She played Ellie in the David Bowie and Enda Walsh musical Lazarus when it played a limited season at the Kings Cross Theatre from October 2016 through January 2017. She was nominated for the WhatsOnStage Award for Best Supporting Actress in a Musical.

In 2018 she played the role of Pocahontas in the new play "Romana Tells Jim" also starring Joe Bannister and Ruby Bentall at Bush Theatre in London.

In January 2019 she joined the cast of Holby City, playing Chloe Godard, a CT surgeon and the daughter of the YAU consultant Ange Godard.

On 21 March 2022, she took over the role of Sally Bowles in Cabaret at the Playhouse Theatre, starring alongside Fra Fee.

Personal life
She met musical theatre actor Tom Andrew Hargreaves while she was in the touring production of 9 to 5 in 2012. They married in October 2021.

Filmography

Theatre credits

References

British musical theatre actresses
Living people
Year of birth missing (living people)